Marquette School is a historic school building located in South Bend, Indiana. It was designed by Austin & Shambleau and built in 1936–1937 with funds provided by the Public Works Administration. It is a two-story, Art Deco style brick building with additions constructed in 1948 and 1953. The school houses an auditorium, gymnasium, and classrooms. It remained in use as a school until 2010.

It was listed on the National Register of Historic Places in 2013.

References

Public Works Administration in Indiana
School buildings on the National Register of Historic Places in Indiana
School buildings completed in 1937
Art Deco architecture in Indiana
Buildings and structures in South Bend, Indiana
National Register of Historic Places in St. Joseph County, Indiana